Aurora is the second studio album released by South Korean singer Bada in September 2004.  Although her image concept did not change from her first album, which was successful, Aurora failed to sell well.  Lead single "Aurora", which was a love ballad, also fared poorly, leading Bada to switch singles quickly.  The second single was "Eyes", which in contrast was a R&B-dance track.  Sales of the album were around 23,000, about 100,000 less copies than what A Day of Renew sold.

Track listing 
 Happy Face
 Aurora
 Eyes
 Interlude
 Go By
 Good Luck
 Into You (feat. Hi-D)
 Thank You
 Sweet Potato
 Dreaming
 Higher
 Blue Juice
 Little Boy

External links
 Bada's Official Site
 JIIN Entertainment's Official Site

2004 albums
Bada (singer) albums